The Mexican Armed Forces have a number of bugle and trumpet calls for the different branches. Drums and bugles are used to signal the various calls for most units of the Army, Navy and Air Force while the cavalry trumpet is used to signal calls for the cavalry units of the Army, Army artillery units and the Air Force. Many of the calls and signals listed below are also used by civilian  drum and bugle bands.

All-forces calls
 Attention - signals the unit to stand at attention, also signals the end of flag raising and lowering
 At Ease
 Slope Arms - signals the unit to slope arms
 Present Arms - signals the unit to present arms
 Order Arms - signals the unit to order arms
 Port Arms
 Sling Arms
 Unsling Arms
 Ground Arms
 Fix Bayonets
 Remove Bayonets
 Drumbeat pace/Marchpast pace
 Accelerated/double pace
 Honor March (Marcha de Honor) - performed in the presence of the President of Mexico and the National Defense Secretary/Assistant Secretary. It is played to accompany the National Anthem of Mexico or played as a stand-alone march
 Salute to the Flag (Toque de Bandera) - performed during flag raising and lowering ceremonies and marches of honor commemorating the Flag of Mexico. Like the Marcha de Honor, played to the accompaniment of the National Anthem of Mexico or as a stand-alone march.
 NCO's and Enlisted Arrival - Signals the arrival of NCO's and enlisted personnel
 Officers Arrival - Signals the arrival of officers
 Arrival of Honor -  Signals the arrival of the guest of honor
 Bands/Musicians Arrival - Signals the arrival of the military band
 Buglers Arrival - Played by the drums and bugles to signal their arrival

Branch calls

Mexican Army
The Mexican Army uses 129 bugle calls. Most are played by drummers and buglers in the infantry bands and the engineers. The remainders are played by trumpeters of the cavalry and artillery.

Infantry calls
 Alarm
 Infantry
 Column
 Sections/Squads
 Companies
 Battalion
 Cease Firing
 Lines
 Listing
 Reunion
 Regiment
 Platoons
 Medic

Cavalry and armored branch calls
 Marcha Dragona (Dragoons March)
 Regiment
 Veterinarian visit
 Charge
 At the Gallop
 Shoulder, Saber
 Order Saber
 Cavalry
 Squadrons
 Troops
 Platoon
 Water
 At the Trot
 Walk March
 Start Engine
 Mount 
 Dismount

Artillery calls
 Battery
 Artillery
 Gunners
 Center
 Counter March
 Close cannon
 Close Mounting
 Carriages Column
 Discharge
 Distance
 Battery Fire
 On Batteries
 On Discharge
 Dismount from vehicles
 Mount vehicles
 Intervals
 Lines
 Lines of Columns
 Artillery March
 Auxiliaries' Arrival
 Groups
 Start Engines

Mexican Navy
Drum and bugle calls are always performed by the Mexican Navy's drum and bugle bands, whether aboard ships or on land. 
 Ship Batteries
 Flotilla
 Marines on board
 Sailors on board
 Fleet
 Squadron
 Flag Officers' arrival
 Gun Salute
 Ship Companies
 Naval Artillery
 Battle Stations

Mexican Air Force
Drum and bugle calls of the Mexican Air Force are used on the ground on airbases.
 Group
 Wing
 Squadron
 Medic
 Flight

See also
 Mexican Armed Forces
 Bugle call
 El Degüello

Bugle calls
Military of Mexico